Galagete darwini is a moth in the family Autostichidae. It was described by Bernard Landry in 2002. It is found on the Galápagos Islands.

The larvae feed on the dead leaves and/or branches of Scalesia baurii.

References

Moths described in 2002
Galagete